Hillingdon Ranch is a  working ranch located in Kendall County in the U.S. state of Texas. It was founded in 1887 by architect Alfred Giles, and named after his birthplace Hillingdon, Middlesex, England.

References

Further reading

Ranches in Texas
Geography of Kendall County, Texas
1887 establishments in Texas
American companies established in 1887